Sephardic Home for the Aged (also known as Sephardic Home for Nursing and Rehabilitation and Sephardic Nursing and Rehabilitation Center) was a long-term nursing home and short-term medical rehabilitation facility. Its Brooklyn location now houses King David Center for Nursing and Rehabilitation, and, like the prior operators, services both Ashkenazic and Sephardic patients and residents.

History
Sephardic opened in 1951, with their initial focus on those elderly whose primary language and food preferences
reflected that of the Sephardic community.

Decades later they renamed, under different management, to King David. The facility continued operating during the Coronavirus period.

See also
 Haym Salomon Nursing Home

References

External links
 

Nursing homes in the United States
1951 establishments in New York City